Gyula Király may refer to:

 Gyula Király (footballer) (1908–?), Hungarian footballer
 Gyula Király (historian) (1927–2011), Hungarian literary historian